The 1898 VFL Grand Final was an Australian rules football game contested between the Essendon Football Club and Fitzroy Football Club, held in Melbourne on 24 September 1898. The match was played to determine the premiers for the 1898 VFL season. Fitzroy won the match by 15 points. The game was played under atrocious ground conditions, in front of 16,538 people, at the Junction Oval.

The match is recognised as the first VFL grand final, although the term "grand final" was not in wide use until 1931. It was the first time that Victorian Football League premiership was decided in a final match, after the 1897 premiership was won under a different finals system by Essendon when they finished above three other clubs on the finals series ladder.

Both the Fitzroy back-pocket Stan Reid and the Essendon full-forward Charlie Moore later died in South Africa in active service during the Anglo-Boer War; Moore on 5 May 1901 and Reid on 23 June 1901.

Season
During the 1898 home-and-away season all teams played each other twice. The final end-of season ladder was:

Lead-up 
According to the 1898 premiership system the eight teams in the VFL competition were divided into two sections based on their positions on the ladder: the first group were the teams that finished first, third, fifth and seventh and the second group were the teams that finished second, fourth, sixth and eighth.

The teams in the two sections played three rounds of four round-robin matches on three consecutive Saturdays:
 Round One: (1) v (3), (2) v (4), (5) v (7), and (6) v (8).
 Round Two: (1) v (5), (2) v (6), (3) v (7), and (4) v (8).
 Round Three: (1) v (7), (2) v (8), (3) v (5), and (4) v (6).

The winners of the two sections were Fitzroy and Collingwood respectively (for results of all of the round-robin matches and, a week later (17 September 1898), the two teams played each other at the Brunswick Street Oval, with Fitzroy winning the match 2.10 (22) to 1.5 (11).

"Grand final" 
The 1898 rules stipulated that, if the team at the top of the ladder at the end of the home-and-away season (the "minor premiers") had not won the "sectional final" match between the two sectional winners, the "minor premier" had the right to "challenge" the winner and, having done so, the winner of that grand finale match was declared the season's premiership team.

Venue selection 
The VFL had not anticipated a challenge final in the match fixtures before the home-and-away season began, nor had it made any sort of a tentative venue booking to provide for such a possible eventuality: this was a significant omission given that each of the grounds were to be top-dressed and otherwise "cultivated" in preparation for the oncoming cricket season immediately after the scheduled football season was over.

Although Essendon and Fitzroy could not agree on the choice of a single venue, they suggested three mutually acceptable venues for the match:
 The East Melbourne Cricket Ground, the home ground of minor premiers Essendon.
 The Brunswick Street Oval, the home ground of Fitzroy.
 The neutral Lake Oval on the verge of Albert Park Lake, close to the city and well served by rail and a number of tram routes.

After the VFL referred the decision to the VFL's Match Arrangement Committee, they, upon the express instructions of that committee, rejected the suggestions of the two teams outright and the match was controversially scheduled to be played at the Junction Oval.

The Junction Oval was in an appalling condition as the ground had not been used since the second Saturday of the sectional round-robin match three weeks earlier (3 September) and, since then, it had been thoroughly topdressed and "cultivated" in anticipation of the coming cricket season. Also, the cricket ground's asphalt cycling track that lay between the boundary line and the fence presented a considerable danger to the footballers.

Despite being the "challenger", the Essendon flatly refused to play in the scheduled match, declaring that it would rather forfeit the match and the premiership than play on such a dangerous surface. This view was also strongly supported by Fitzroy, whose captain, Alec Sloan, had also taken the step of signing a statutory declaration to the effect that, in his opinion, the ground was entirely unfit to play on.

Essendon immediately lodged an appeal with the VFL against the match arrangement committee's decision, partly on the basis of the condition of the ground and partly because the committee, asked to decide on one of three mutually acceptable venues, had chosen a fourth that was acceptable to neither participant.

The VFL, perhaps somewhat driven by the fact that the attraction of a finals system was one of the major reasons that the eight teams had left the VFA and formed the VFL in the first place, had a special meeting to hear Essendon's appeal. While it chose to endorse the committee's decision, it also did everything it could to convince Essendon to play the match.

Essendon did not actually agree to play the match until the night before the game; ultimately, this "in doubt until the last minute match" was still attended by 16,538 paying spectators; it certainly would have been a much larger crowd otherwise.

The ground had been in such a dreadful condition that in the week prior to the match over 40 dray-loads of rubbish, soil and street-sweepings had been taken from the ground. All of this last minute work greatly improved the playing surface at the ground, with sportswriters noting that while the ground was imperfect, it was nevertheless fit for use.  Dry, windy weather and patches of ground where the topsoil had not bound meant that players often fell on the grassless slippery ground for want of some sort of grip, and play was often impeded by clouds of dust.

To prevent any repeat of the events leading up to the 1898 challenge final, the VFL agreed that from 1899 they would schedule for a possible challenge final in advance.

Teams
In 1898, all VFL teams had 20 on-the-field players and no "reserves".

However, although there were no reserves, any player who had left the playing field for any reason at all could resume his place on the field at any time.

Fitzroy selected two sets of brothers in its team, Bill and Jack Dalton and Jim and Mick Grace.

The Fitzroy and the Essendon teams teams were:

 Umpire – Ivo Crapp

Match

Essendon had beaten Fitzroy in their round 1 and round 8 matches by 53 and 43 points respectively. Fitzroy had beaten Essendon by 29 points in the third match of their round-robin Sectional matches.

Both teams had great difficulty playing football in the appalling ground conditions – as can be seen by the low scores – and the tough, bustling Fitzroy team handled the conditions far better than the Essendon team that had hoped to spread the game out as far as possible.
Fitzroy took the lead in the first few minutes of the match, and Essendon were never able to catch up.

Essendon were further demoralized when Fitzroy champion forward and follower Mick Grace, renowned for his marking skill and kicking prowess, flew high over a pack to take a spectacular high mark and kicked a long range goal.

In a very tight, defensive second half, as the playing conditions deteriorated even further, only one goal was scored. Fitzroy went on to beat Essendon 5.8 (38) to 3.5 (23).

Statistics

See also
 1898 VFL season

References and footnotes

Sources
 Grand Final Umpires: VFL/AFL 1897–2016, AFL Umpires Association 2016 Yearbook, AFL Umpires Association, (Docklands), 2016, pp.52–53.
 Main, J. & Allen, D., Fallen — The Ultimate Heroes: Footballers Who Never Returned From War, Crown Content, (Melbourne), 2002. 
 Maplestone, M., Flying Higher: History of the Essendon Football Club 1872–1996, Essendon Football Club, (Melbourne), 1996. 
 Rogers, S. & Brown, A., Every Game Ever Played: VFL/AFL Results 1897–1997 (Sixth Edition), Viking Books, (Ringwood), 1998. 
 Ross, J. (ed), 100 Years of Australian Football 1897–1996: The Complete Story of the AFL, All the Big Stories, All the Great Pictures, All the Champions, Every AFL Season Reported, Viking, (Ringwood), 1996.

External links
 1898 Finals – AFL Tables
 AFL Player Statistics (Round by Round): Essendon Football Club 1898
 AFL Player Statistics (Round by Round): Fitzroy Football Club 1898
 Observer,"Football Championship: The Final Match: Fitzroy v. Essendon: Fitzroy Win the Premiership", The Argus, (Monday, 26 September 1898), p.7, col.E.
 "1898" (Brisbane Lions Website, 1 May 2006)
 "Fitzroy Firsts: Etched in History" (Brisbane Lions Website, 1 May 2006) 

VFL/AFL Grand Finals
Fitzroy Football Club
Essendon Football Club
Vfl Grand Final, 1898
Sports competitions in Melbourne
VFL Grand Final
1890s in Melbourne